Maggette or Magette is a surname. Notable people with the surname include:

Corey Maggette (born 1979), American basketball player
Josh Magette (born 1989), American basketball player

See also
Magnette